Cymindis impressa is a species of ground beetle in the subfamily Harpalinae. It was described by Reitter in 1893.

References

impressa
Beetles described in 1893